Zhu Jun (also Deon Zhu) (born 26 April 1964) is a Chinese host and actor. Zhu was a member of the 11th National Committee of the Chinese People's Political Consultative Conference, a member of 8th National Committee of the China Federation of Literary and Art Circles, and a member of 10th National Committee of the All-China Youth Federation.

He won the Golden Mike Award's for Television in 1999 and 2003, and received Golden Eagle Award for Best Programme Host in 2003.

Biography
Zhu was born in Lanzhou, Gansu in 1964, with his ancestral home in Luoyang, Henan, with his father an artist in Lanzhou Military Region.

At the age of 11, Zhu studied xiangsheng, sketch comedy, kuaiban under his father.

In October 1981, Zhu joined the People's Liberation Army and served four years.

From September 1985 to September 1988, Zhu worked in Gansu Song and Dance Troupe. From September 1988 to March 1996, Zhu worked in Lanzhou Military Region.

Zhu joined the China Central Television from March 1996 to February 2017.

Zhu hosted the CCTV New Year's Gala from February 1997 to January 2017.

Sexual assault allegations and #MeToo in China
In the summer of 2018, during the Chinese version of the #MeToo movement, Zhu was accused of sexual harassment on the popular Chinese social media platform Weibo.

Zhou Xiaoxuan, a screenwriter in Beijing known in China under her nickname Xianzi, stated in 2018, when she was 25 years old, that Zhu had assaulted her in his dressing room in 2014. In August 2018, Zhu filed a lawsuit against Zhou, who subsequently countersued. Zhou also reported the incident to the Chinese police, who advised her to drop the issue over concern of endangering the jobs of her parents in civil service and a state-owned firm.

On December 2, 2020, the Haidian District People's Court held formal evidentiary hearing on sexual harassment case against Zhu Jun.  On 14 September 2021, after the second hearing, the court ruled that Zhou's harassment claim against Zhu did not meet the standard of proof to proceed.

Works

Television
 Artistic Life
 Music Life

Sketch comedy

Awards
 1999 Golden Mike Award
 2003 Golden Mike Award
 2003 Golden Eagle Award for Best Programme Host

Personal life
In May 1993, Zhu married Tan Mei, who is a Chinese dancer, the couple has a son Zhu Sitan.

References

External links

1964 births
People from Lanzhou
Peking University alumni
CCTV television presenters
Living people
Male actors from Gansu